10-8: Officers on Duty is an American police drama television series created by Louis St. Clair and Jorge Zamacona, that aired on ABC from September 28, 2003 to January 25, 2004. The title is in reference to the ten-code for "officer in service and available for calls."

Premise
Rico Amonte, a rookie deputy sheriff with the Los Angeles County Sheriff's Department, fresh from the police academy is assigned to Senior Deputy John Barnes for his probationary period where he learns the ropes and puts his training into practice.

While he makes his share of rookie mistakes, including being responsible for having a squad car stolen, he also has a keen eye for details exemplified when he is not fooled by a "homeowner" who says he accidentally tripped his home security alarm (the man, who was actually a burglar, had a tattoo of a cross on his arm, but Amonte noticed a mezuzah on the doorpost).

While he passed his initial evaluation, the show was canceled before his final evaluation was completed.

Cast
 Danny Nucci as Deputy Rico Amonte
 Ernie Hudson as Senior Deputy John Henry Barnes
 Mercedes Colon as Sheryl Torres 
 Travis Schuldt as Deputy Chase Williams
 Scott William Winters as Senior Deputy Matt Jablonski
 Indigo as Tisha Graves
 Miguel Sandoval as Captain Otis Briggs

Production
10-8: Officers on Duty was created by Louis St. Clair and Jorge Zamacona, who also served as writers. The series was executive produced by Aaron Spelling and E. Duke Vincent. Several of the series' musical pieces were written and recorded by guitarist Arlen Roth.

Episodes

External links
 

2000s American crime drama television series
2003 American television series debuts
2004 American television series endings
American Broadcasting Company original programming
Television series by ABC Studios
English-language television shows
Television series by Spelling Television
Television shows set in Los Angeles